Nabiyev or Nabiev is a Russianized Turkic (Tatar, Kazakh, Uzbek, Azerbaijani), Iranian (Tajik), and Caucasian (Dagestan) family name. It may refer to:

Agil Nabiyev (born 1982), Azerbaijani football player
Ilgar Nabiyev (born 1987), Azerbaijani football player
Khurshid Nabiev (born 1985), Uzbek judoka
Nadir Nabiyev (born 1980), Azerbaijani football player
Narguis Nabieva (born 1985), Tajik athlete
Rahmon Nabiyev (1930–1993), Tajik politician and President
Tatiana Nabieva (born 1994), Russian gymnast

Tatar-language surnames
Kazakh-language surnames
Uzbek-language surnames
Azerbaijani-language surnames
Tajik-language surnames
Surnames of Dagestani origin